Song of Antioch may refer to:

Canso d'Antioca, Old Occitan crusade song
Chanson d'Antioche, Old French crusade song